Below are the results of the 2007 Biathlon World Championships 2007 for the men's relay, which took place on 4 February 2007.

Results
* P - Prone, S - Standing, T - Total penalties

Did not start:
Johanna Holma,  SWE
Liming Liu,  CHN
Magda Rezlerova,  CZE
Lapped:
Mari Laukkanen,  FIN
Zuzana Tryznova,  CZE
Sarah Konrad,  United States
Jury decisions:
Time adjustment: Teja Gregorin,  SLO  -10.0

References 

Women's Pursuit
2007 in Italian women's sport